Onibaba may refer to:

Onibaba (folklore), creatures in Japanese folklore
Onibaba (film), a 1964 Japanese horror film named after the creatures